The Amalgamated Society of Gas Workers, Brickmakers and General Labourers (ASGWBM&GL) was a trade union representing labourers in the United Kingdom, particularly in the Birmingham area.

The union was established in 1889, on the initiative of Eli Bloor and Allen Granger, leaders of established trade unions in Birmingham.  It had 2,846 by 1892, and began absorbing smaller unions: the Bristol Iron Plate Trade Society in 1896, and the Birmingham Public Workers Labourers in 1897.  By that year, membership had grown to 5,020.

The Scottish Ploughmen, Carters and General Labourers Federal Union joined the society in 1900, but amid confusion it soon left again.  The Frost Cog and Screw Makers Society merged in during 1911.  Membership continued to grow, and when the Birmingham and District Municipal Employees' Association joined in 1915, it reached 17,240.  That year, the union renamed itself as the "Amalgamated Society of Gas, Municipal and General Workers".

In 1921, the union merged into the National Union of General Workers.

General Secretaries
1889: Robert Toller
1907: Henry Simpson

References

Defunct trade unions of the United Kingdom
1889 establishments in the United Kingdom
Trade unions established in 1889
Trade unions based in the West Midlands (county)